& Then Boom is the debut studio album by American new wave band Iglu & Hartly. It was released on September 29, 2008.

Critical reception

Reviews of & Then Boom upon release were mixed. As of March 2015, the album holds an aggregated score of a 42 out of 100, indicating "mixed or average reviews", based on six sources. Allmusic journalist Anthony Tognazzini described & Then Boom as "fizzy, fun retro-glam-electro-pop from beginning to end", also noting the variety of the sounds on the record. There were three-star reviews from the Hot Press and Q, with the former's Edwin McFee calling it a "guilty pleasure" and latter calling it a "kitchen-sink hybrid" that "works remarkably well". Caroline Sullivan of The Guardian gave the album a similar score, praising it as "crisp electro-rock with a big hook in every tune, and lyrics that present them as a bunch of civic-minded young fellows."

However, in more varied reviews, The Guardian's sister paper The Observer, Craig McLean opined that "On the one hand, it's riotously good fun; on the other, it's a bit naff." Shaun Newport, writing for musicOMH, called it a "frustration and disappointment" to listen to, saying that the group "sound nice, look nice but you’d be pressed to find any substance." However, he did give them credit for "absolutely signif[ying] the beginning of the end of our love affair with the ’80s. It was cool, then it was pop and now it has shamelessly gone too far. Thank goodness we always have time to learn from our mistakes." Entertainment.ie's Lauren Murphy called most of the rapping "cringeworthy", with her overall verdict of the album describing it as "two different, disjointed and discordant bands - neither with any direction, and both offering only minimal splashes of fun."

There were extremely negative reviews that questioned if BBC Radio 1's promotion of Iglu & Hartly was a joke, as well as criticized the record's cheap and unprofessional-sounding production and songwriting. It got a zero-out-of-ten review from David Renshaw of Drowned in Sound, calling it "the worst album of [2008]." Racheal Crowther, a critic for DIY, rated it a one out of ten, writing that the tracks were "so similar it feels like listening to one really long song rather than an album." In a two-out-of-ten review from NME, Rick Martin called it "an abomination of a debut album, informed by all the most disgusting musical faux pas of the past 20 years." Jarvis Anderson responded to this negative critical reception in an interview; "Reviews are interesting, I'll take negative criticism if someone explains why. We laugh hard at some of them – we take it with a light heart. I certainly haven't really read a negative review that's changed my mind about anything. If anyone's got an opinion maybe I'll use it if it's good, I'm not that stubborn."

Track listing 

All songs written and composed by Iglu & Hartly

Personnel 

 Jarvis Anderson – vocals, keyboards
 Sam Martin – vocals, keyboards
 Simon Katz – guitar
 Luis Rosiles – drums
 Michael Bucher – bass

Charts

References 

Iglu & Hartly albums
2008 debut albums
Mercury Records albums